The 30th Meijin was the 30th Meijin tournament of the board game go. The tournament was held in 2005 in Japan and was won by Cho U.

Challenger Group

Challenger Final

Final 

Go competitions in Japan
2005 in Japanese sport
2005 in go